Erica Shen-Ning Wu (born May 15, 1996) is an American table tennis player who competed in the 2012 Summer Olympics in London. She was the 2011 and 2012 US national champion in women's doubles (with Gao Jun) and reached the semifinals in women's singles at the 2011, 2012 and 2013 US national championships. She was part of the US team that won the bronze medal at the 2011 Pan American Games. At the 2012 North American Championships, Wu was the runner-up in women's singles behind fellow Olympian Lily Zhang.  she was a senior at Princeton University studying computer science. Between 2018 and 2022, she worked as a Software Engineer at Meta.

Personal life
Erica Wu was born in Arcadia, California. Her parents are Taiwanese immigrants who worked as actuaries. She is an only child.

References 

1996 births
Living people
American sportspeople of Taiwanese descent
American female table tennis players
American sportswomen of Chinese descent
People from Arcadia, California
Olympic table tennis players of the United States
Table tennis players at the 2012 Summer Olympics
Princeton University people
Pan American Games bronze medalists for the United States
Pan American Games medalists in table tennis
Table tennis players at the 2011 Pan American Games
Medalists at the 2011 Pan American Games
21st-century American women